René Biver (24 October 1920 – 24 October 1983) was a Luxembourgian racing cyclist. He rode in the 1948, 1949 Tour de France, 1951 Tour de France and 1952 Tour de France.

References

1920 births
1983 deaths
Luxembourgian male cyclists
Sportspeople from Luxembourg City